Alles Leben ist Kampf (English translation: All Life is Struggle) is a National Socialist propaganda film produced in 1937, directed by Herbert Gerdes, and W. Hüttig.

This film is about disabled people and the Law for the Prevention of Hereditarily Diseased Offspring, passed to stop disabilities affecting other generations through forced sterilization. At the same time, it called for hereditary healthy Germans to reproduce so as to avoid the death of their people. It was one of six propagandistic movies produced by the NSDAP, the Reichsleitung, Rassenpolitisches Amt or the Office of Racial Policy from 1935–1937 to demonize people in Germany diagnosed with mental illness and mental retardation.

This movie is along the same lines as Erbkrank (1936) which was similarly directed by Herbert Gerdes.

See also
Aktion T4

External links

Alles Leben ist Kampf via cine-holocaust
Free download at Internet Archive

1937 films
German short documentary films
Films directed by Herbert Gerdes
Nazi eugenics
Sterilization (medicine)
German black-and-white films
1937 documentary films
1930s German films